Maria Both (born 1941) is a Romanian former swimmer. She competed in the women's 100 metre backstroke at the 1956 Summer Olympics.

References

External links
 

1941 births
Living people
Olympic swimmers of Romania
Swimmers at the 1956 Summer Olympics
Universiade medalists in swimming
Sportspeople from Târgu Mureș
Universiade silver medalists for Romania
Universiade bronze medalists for Romania
Romanian female backstroke swimmers
Medalists at the 1961 Summer Universiade